Michael Akoto (born 3 October 1997) is a German-Ghanaian professional footballer who plays as a defender for  club Dynamo Dresden.

References

External links
 
 

1997 births
Living people
German sportspeople of Ghanaian descent
Ghanaian footballers
German footballers
Association football defenders
2. Bundesliga players
3. Liga players
Regionalliga players
SV Wehen Wiesbaden players
1. FSV Mainz 05 II players
Dynamo Dresden players
Ghanaian expatriate footballers
Ghanaian expatriate sportspeople in Germany
Expatriate footballers in Germany